is a ward of the city of Sakai in Osaka Prefecture, Japan. The population density is 4,667 per square kilometer. The name means "West Ward."

The wards of Sakai were established when Sakai became a city designated by government ordinance on April 1, 2006.

References

External links

Ward office official webpage 

Wards of Sakai, Osaka